David John Pyatt (born 26 September 1973) is a horn player from Watford, England.  In 1988, aged 14, he became the then youngest winner of the BBC Young Musician of the Year competition.  In 1996 Gramophone Magazine announced David Pyatt as their Young Artist of the Year. Pyatt studied at Watford Grammar School for Boys, followed by Selwyn College, Cambridge.

His subsequent solo career saw his debut at the BBC Proms in 1993 performing Strauss' Second Horn Concerto. In 2004, he played Strauss' First Horn Concerto at the Last Night of The Proms, and also appeared at the Edinburgh Festival playing Weber's Concertino for Horn and Orchestra.

Pyatt was Principal Horn of the London Symphony Orchestra from the 1998/9 season.

In 2013, Pyatt joined the London Philharmonic Orchestra as joint principal. In 2019, he was appointed principal horn of the Orchestra of the Royal Opera House, Covent Garden.

References 

 Artist profile at Clarion Seven Muses
 Profile at BBC Young Musician of the Year
 Biography at Concert Artist

People educated at Watford Grammar School for Boys
British classical horn players
Living people
1974 births
Academics of the Royal Academy of Music
London Symphony Orchestra players
Eurovision Young Musicians Finalists
People from Watford
Alumni of Selwyn College, Cambridge